Perry Merren (born 11 August 1969) is a Caymanian former cyclist. He competed in the road race at the 1988 Summer Olympics.

References

1969 births
Living people
Caymanian male cyclists
Olympic cyclists of the Cayman Islands
Cyclists at the 1988 Summer Olympics
Place of birth missing (living people)